The Canadian Major Football League (CMFL) is the national governing body for semi-pro canadian football (formally known as the Canadian Senior Football League), dedicated to advocating for the promotion of Canadian senior football.

The CMFL was formed in 1999 by the Alberta Football League (AFL) and Manitoba Football League (MFL) in attempt to crown the amateur national champion of Canada, and replaced the Canadian Senior Intermediate championship game. Since 2002 the game has been played between the AFL and Northern Football Conference (NFC) league champions. The two leagues cooperate but remain legally separate entities.

Trophy
The participating teams compete for the Sid Forster Memorial Trophy, emblematic of the Canadian Major Football Championship. The permanent trophy was provided by the NFC in memory of long-time Sudbury Spartans head coach and Canadian Football Hall of Fame member Sid Forester, who died in 1994. The trophy stays in possession of the game winner for the year following their victory.

Rules
CMFL games are played under the host conference Canadian amateur rules. 

When the AFL hosts
 Three downs
 One yard line of restraint
 Cut block rule to include; running backs only, within the tackle box, 5 yards deep, on blitzing players though A and B gap, no engaged blitzing player may be cut.

When the NFC hosts
Four downs
Zero yard line of restraint
Cut block rule to include: The Canadian Amateur Rule Book for Tackle Football, which is blocking below the waist is allowed anywhere within the close line play area, which by rule is 2 yards on either side of the line of scrimmage and between the tackles.

Forster Memorial Trophy Games

{{small|Home team in bold.}}

ChampionsActive franchise in bold.''

See also 
Football Canada
Alberta Football League
Northern Football Conference

References

2
1999 establishments in Canada
Sports leagues established in 1999